Mark Lautens, OC,  (born July 9, 1959) is a Canadian organic chemist and is a University Professor at the University of Toronto.

He is known for his involvement in the developments of asymmetric ring-opening chemistry, synthetic utility and scope of the Catellani Reaction including the use of ligands to facilitate the reaction, carbohalogenation, multi-component multi-catalyst reactions, and domino catalysis. He has supervised over 50 doctoral students and has published over 400 peer-reviewed articles in scientific journals.

Education and career 

Born in Hamilton, Ontario, Lautens received a Bachelor of Science degree with distinction from the University of Guelph in 1981 where he worked with Professor Gord Lange. He then moved to the University of Wisconsin–Madison for his Ph.D. (1981-1985) working with Professor Barry M. Trost with an NSERC Postgraduate Scholarship. Following graduation, he was an NSERC PDF at Harvard University (1985-1987) in the laboratories of Professor David A. Evans. In 1987 he was appointed as an NSERC URF assistant professor at the University of Toronto and was promoted to professor in 1995. Since 2012, he has held the rank of University Professor, awarded to up to 2% of the faculty at the University of Toronto.

Science advocacy 
Lautens has made an effort to improve government support for funding science in Canada, and for young researchers in particular, by contributing op-ed pieces to various newspapers including The Toronto Star, The Globe and Mail and The Hill Times. He has also described his personal experiences while presiding at citizenship ceremonies  and has also questioned why there are not more scientists running for office.

During the COVID-19 pandemic of 2020, Lautens published a piece describing how research funding to science and medicine are crucial for a successful response and supports paying students and post-docs a better wage. He mentions how we have learned a lot about the importance of science, but even more about how science needs to be deployed broadly and with full force if we hope to tackle the most challenging societal problems. He further described how the current situation is shedding light on the "messy and sometimes infuriating process of scientific discovery". He has encouraged compassion and empathy in the time of the pandemic.

Honours and awards
Lautens was made a fellow of the Royal Society of Canada in 2001. He is currently the AstraZeneca Professor of Organic Chemistry (1998–present) and was an NSERC/Merck Frosst Industrial Research Chair (2003–2013). In 2009, he was an Alexander von Humboldt awardee. In 2013, he was awarded the Chemical Institute of Canada's CIC Medal. In 2014, he was made an Officer of the Order of Canada "for his contributions at the forefront of organic chemistry, which have led to the creation of new medicinal compounds with fewer side effects". He was awarded an honorary degree, Doctor of Science, honoris causa, from the University of Guelph in 2016. In 2017, he was awarded the Henry Marshall Tory Medal from the Royal Society of Canada.

In addition to his awards for his research, he received the J.J. Berry Smith Doctoral Supervision Award in 2017, which recognizes outstanding performance in the multiple roles associated with doctoral supervision. In 2020, he won the E.W.R. Steacie Award for making a distinguished contribution to chemistry while working in Canada, being the second chemistry professor at the University of Toronto to do so. Recently, the American Chemical Society announced that Lautens won the 2021 Herbert C. Brown Award for Creative Research in Synthetic Methods for his outstanding creative research that involved the discovery and development of novel and useful methods for chemical synthesis. Most recently, he is the recipient of the University of Toronto's 2021 Chair's Teaching Award.

Other awards 
 E.W.R. Steacie Fellow (1994)
 Fellow of the Royal Society of Canada (2001)
 A. C. Cope Scholar (2006)
 Alexander von Humboldt Awardee (2009–2015)
 Fellow of the Royal Society of UK (2011)
 Royal Society of Chemistry Pedler Award (2011)
 Killam Research Fellowship (2013–2015)
 Officer of the Order of Canada (2014)
 CIC Catalysis Award (2016)
 J.J. Berry Smith Doctoral Supervision Award (2017)
Henry Marshall Tory Medal (2017)
Senior Fellow of Massey College
E.W.R. Steacie Award (2020)
University of Guelph Alumni Association Alumni of Honour (2020)
Herbert C. Brown Award for Creative Research in Synthetic Methods (2021)
Chair's Teaching Award (2021)

References

1959 births
Canadian chemists
Fellows of the Royal Society of Canada
Living people
Officers of the Order of Canada
People from Hamilton, Ontario
University of Guelph alumni
Academic staff of the University of Toronto
University of Wisconsin–Madison alumni